Marek Zając (born September 17, 1973 in Kraków), known as Marek in China, is a Polish former soccer player and currently Manager of R&F. A versatile defender, he experienced considerable success with Wisła Kraków before moving to Turkey to play for Süper Lig sides Denizlispor and A. Sebatspor until he joined Chinese side Shenzhen Jianlibao and became a prominent figure within the team for five seasons.

Club career
Marek Zając previously played for Cracovia and Hutnik Kraków before he moved to Polish powerhouse Wisła Kraków where he experienced considerable success by winning two league titles and a call up to his national team. This saw Turkish side Denizlispor interested with his services and Zając moved to them during the 2001-02 season, however he only played in ten league games before returning to Poland with Zagłębie Lubin the following season. With another chance to play in the Süper Lig Marek Zając joined Akçaabat Sebatspor in the 2003-04 season where he stayed for one season.

Halfway through the 2004 Chinese league season Zając moved to Shenzhen Jianlibao to help them in their push for the league title. Achieving this he remained with the team for the next five seasons despite the exit of most of their top stars and manager, however when he finally left the team at the end of the 2008 league season he became the team's longest serving foreigner. Zając remained in China and joined second tier side Liaoning Hongyun at the beginning of the 2009 league season and helped the team win the division title.

International career
Zając made two appearances for the Polish national team.

Career statistics

Management statistics

Honours
Wisła Kraków
Ekstraklasa : 1998–99, 2000-01

Shenzhen Shangqingyin
Chinese Super League: 2004

Liaoning Hongyun
China League One: 2009

References

External links
 

1973 births
Living people
Polish footballers
Poland international footballers
Shenzhen F.C. players
Akçaabat Sebatspor footballers
Denizlispor footballers
Zagłębie Lubin players
Wisła Kraków players
Liaoning F.C. players
Hutnik Nowa Huta players
Ekstraklasa players
Süper Lig players
Chinese Super League players
China League One players
Expatriate footballers in China
Expatriate footballers in Turkey
Polish expatriate footballers
Polish expatriate sportspeople in China
Footballers from Kraków
Association football defenders